Fort Warren may refer to:
Fort Warren (Massachusetts)
Fort Warren (Texas) 
Fort Warren (Vermont)
 Fort D.A. Russell (Wyoming), formerly known as Fort Francis E. Warren, subsequently as Francis E. Warren Air Force Base
Francis E. Warren Air Force Base